Aiden Joseph Morris (born 25 April 1993) is an English former first-class cricketer.

Morris was born at Nottingham in April 1993. He was educated at Loughborough Grammar School, before going up to Loughborough University. While studying at Loughborough, he made two appearances in first-class cricket for Loughborough MCCU, both against Hampshire in 2012 and 2013. He scored 23 runs in his two matches, with a high score of 18 not out, in addition to taking 2 wickets with right-arm medium-fast bowling.

References

External links

1993 births
Living people
Cricketers from Nottingham
People educated at Loughborough Grammar School
Alumni of Loughborough University
English cricketers
Loughborough MCCU cricketers